Rozov is a Russian masculine surname, its feminine counterpart is Rozova. It may refer to
Joram Rozov (born 1938), Israeli artist
Valeri Rozov (born 1997), Russian football player
Valery Rozov (1964–2017), Russian skydiver

See also
 4070 Rozov, a minor planet
 FC Rozova Dolina, a Bulgarian football club
 Rosen

Russian-language surnames